Reyes is a Spanish word, usually used as a given name or Spanish surname. The literal translation into English is 'kings', but could also be translated as 'royals' or 'royalty'. The Portuguese version of this surname is Reis. Similarly, the Arabic "reyes" (رئيس) signifies a ruler or head of a company or organization. 

People with the name include:

Given name
Reyes Estévez (born 1976), Spanish 1500 metres runner
Reyes Maroto (born 1973), Spanish economist and politician
Reyes Moronta (born 1993), Dominican professional baseball pitcher
Reyes Tamez (born 1952), Mexican immunochemist

Surname

Arts
Alfonso Reyes (1889-1959), a Mexican writer, philosopher, and diplomat
Alisa Reyes (born 1981), an American actress
Andre Reyes, vocalist and guitarist in the Gipsy Kings
Aurora Reyes Flores (1908–1985), a Mexican painter
Canut Reyes, vocalist in the Gipsy Kings
Coney Reyes (born 1954), Filipina actress, host, and producer
Cristine Reyes (born 1989), a Filipina actress
Emma Reyes (1919–2003), Colombian painter and writer
Ernie Reyes, Jr., an American Taekwondo practitioner and actor
Ginger Reyes (born 1980), an American rock musician
Jesús Reyes Ferreira (1880-1977) a Mexican self-taught artist and antiques/art collector and vendor
Jorge Reyes (Argentine actor) (1907–1985)
Jorge Reyes (Venezuelan actor) (born 1971)
Judy Reyes (born 1968), an American actress
Nicolas Reyes (born 1958), lead vocal of the Gipsy Kings
Madison Reyes, (born 2002), Latin-American actress mostly known for Julie and the Phantoms
Patchai Reyes, vocalist and guitarist in the Gipsy Kings
Paul Reyes, vocalist and guitarist in the Gipsy Kings 
Ron Reyes, a singer for the band Black Flag
Santa Reyes, Dominican singer-songwriter, known professionally as Santaye
Sofía Reyes, a Mexican singer-songwriter and actress
Xiomara Reyes, principal dancer at American Ballet Theatre

Politicians

Edward Diego Reyes (1930-2018), Guamanian politician
José Reyes Ferriz (born 1961), a Mexican politician, mayor of Ciudad Juárez
José Reyes Baeza Terrazas (born 1961), a Mexican politician, governor of Chihuahua
José Reyes Estrada Aguirre (1929–1989), a Mexican politician, mayor of Ciudad Juárez
Juan Francisco Reyes, a Vice President of Guatemala 
Rafael Reyes (1849-1921), a president of Colombia
Raúl Reyes (1948–2008), a leader of the Revolutionary Armed Forces of Colombia
Silvestre Reyes (born 1944), an American politician from the state of Texas

Sports

General
Dominick Reyes (born 1989), an American mixed martial artist
Efren Reyes ("Bata") (born 1954), a Filipino pool player
Faustino Reyes (born 1975), a Spanish boxer
Mika Reyes, a Filipino volleyball player
Polo Reyes (born 1984), a Mexican mixed martial artist
Ricky Reyes (born 1978), a Cuban American professional wrestler
Sammis Reyes (born 1995), Chilean-American football player

Football (soccer)
David Reyes (born 1985), a Chilean footballer
Diego Antonio Reyes (born 1992), a Mexican footballer
José Antonio Reyes (José Antonio Reyes Calderón) (1983–2019), a Spanish international and Sevilla football player
Lorenzo Reyes (born 1991), Chilean footballer
Lorenzo Reyes (Mexican footballer) (born 1951), Mexican footballer

Baseball
Al Reyes (born 1970), a Major League Baseball pitcher
Anthony Reyes (born 1981), an American baseball pitcher
Dennys Reyes (born 1977), a Mexican baseball pitcher
Denyi Reyes (born 1996), a Dominican baseball pitcher
Franmil Reyes (born 1995), a Dominican baseball player
Gerardo Reyes (baseball) (born 1993), a Dominican baseball pitcher
José Reyes (catcher) (born 1983), a Dominican baseball catcher
José Reyes (shortstop) (born 1983), a Dominican baseball player
Nap Reyes (1919-1995), a Cuban baseball player
Pablo Reyes (born 1993), a Dominican baseball player
Víctor Reyes (born 1994), a Venezuelan baseball player

Basketball
Chot Reyes (born 1963), Filipino basketball coach
Jose Reyes, Filipino basketball player
Jay-R Reyes, Filipino basketball player
Raphael Reyes, Filipino basketball player
Renato Reyes, Filipino basketball player
Robert Reyes, Filipino basketball player
Ryan Reyes, Filipino basketball player

Other 
Alba Reyes (born 1981), beauty pageant contestant
Bernardo Reyes (1850-1913), Mexican general
Carlos Reyes (disambiguation), multiple people
Gabriel M. Reyes (1892-1952), Filipino Archbishop
Guadalupe Reyes (1918 – 2000), American activist
J. B. L. Reyes (1902–1994), Associate Justice of the Philippine Supreme Court
José Adriosola Reyes y Mariano, Filipino revolutionary
Luz Mely Reyes (born 1967 or 1968), Venezuelan journalist, writer, and analyst
Pedro Reyes (comedian) (1961–2015), Spanish comedian

Fictional characters
 Joslin Reyes, a member of the Endurance Crew and Technicians in the game Tomb Raider (2013) 
 Reyes Alexander Farrow, the Son of Satan in Darynda Jones's "Charley Davidson" series
Cecilia Reyes, a character from the Marvel comic book series X-Men
Erica Reyes, a werewolf in the MTV television series Teen Wolf
Hugo "Hurley" Reyes, a character from the television series Lost
Carlos Reyes, a character in 9-1-1: Lone Star
Jaime Reyes, the current Blue Beetle in DC Comics
Monica Reyes, a fictional FBI agent in The X-Files
 Nick Reyes, protagonist in Call of Duty: Infinite Warfare
Raven Reyes, a fictional, highly skilled zero-gravity mechanic in The 100
Robbie Reyes, the current Ghost Rider in Marvel Comics
 Samantha Reyes, District Attorney from season 2 of Daredevil
Gabriel Reyes, playable character in the Blizzard Entertainment video game Overwatch, also known as "Reaper"
Cassia Reyes, protagonist of the Matched trilogy by Allie Condie

See also
Reyes (disambiguation)

Spanish unisex given names
Surnames of Filipino origin
Spanish-language surnames